Drobyazkin is a rural locality (a khutor) in Novokiyevskoye Rural Settlement, Novoanninsky District, Volgograd Oblast, Russia. The population was 116 as of 2010. There are 3 streets.

Geography 
Drobyazkin is located in forest steppe on the Khopyorsko-Buzulukskaya Plain, 58 km southeast of Novoanninsky (the district's administrative centre) by road. Poltavsky is the nearest rural locality.

References 

Rural localities in Novoanninsky District